Lodge 49 is an American comedy-drama television series created by Jim Gavin. It aired on the cable television network AMC in the United States from August 6, 2018, to October 14, 2019, spanning two seasons and 20 episodes. The title alludes to the novella The Crying of Lot 49 by Thomas Pynchon, which Gavin references as an inspiration. Although the series was met with positive reviews, AMC canceled the series after its second season due to low ratings.

Plot
AMC describes the series as a "modern fable set in Long Beach, California about a disarmingly optimistic local ex-surfer, Dud (Wyatt Russell), who's drifting after the death of his father and collapse of the family business." In the first season, Dud joins a fraternal order known as the Order of the Lynx, hoping the Lodge can put him "on the path to recover the idyllic life he's lost."

Cast

Main
 Wyatt Russell as Sean "Dud" Dudley, an ex-surfer who discovers Lodge 49 and is looking to lead a happy life.
 Brent Jennings as Ernie Fontaine, a plumbing salesman and member of Lodge 49.
 Sonya Cassidy as Liz Dudley, Dud's twin sister who works as a waitress.
 Linda Emond as Connie Clark, a journalist married to Scott and a member of Lodge 49.
 David Pasquesi as Blaise St. John, a member of Lodge 49 who operates an apothecary and is a philosopher of alchemy.
 Eric Allan Kramer as Scott Miller, a member of Lodge 49 who is married to Connie and serves as a Long Beach Port Harbor patrol officer.

Recurring
 Kenneth Welsh as Larry Loomis, the Sovereign Protector of Lodge 49.
 Avis-Marie Barnes as Anita Jones, a member of Lodge 49.
 Njema Williams as Big Ben Peters, constable of Lodge 49.
 Jimmy Gonzales as Gil Sandoval, astronomer of Lodge 49.
 Brian Doyle-Murray as Bob Kruger, Ernie's boss at work.
 Daniel Stewart Sherman as Jeremy, Liz's boss at Shamroxx.
 David Ury as Champ, an employee at Shamroxx.
 Atkins Estimond as Gerson, an employee at Shamroxx.
 Hayden Szeto as Corporate, an executive at Omni who dates Liz.
 Joe Grifasi as Burt, a pawnbroker.
 Olivia Sandoval as Janet Price, CEO of Omni.
 Vik Sahay as Tarquin, an executive at Omni.
 Tom Nowicki as Bill Dudley, Dud and Liz's deceased father.
 Adam Godley as Jocelyn Pugh, a member of Lodge 1 in London who comes to Lodge 49.
 Bruce Campbell as Gary "The Captain" Green, a general contractor.
 Tyson Ritter as Avery, a fraud who infiltrates Lodge 49.
 Jocelyn Towne as Gloria Keller, an HR manager at Dud's temp job and brief lover.
 Celia Au as Alice Ba, Dud's surfer friend who works at her dad's donut shop.
 Long Nguyen as Paul Ba, Alice's father who owns the local donut shop.
 Sam Puefua as Herman Pola, an associate of pawnbroker Burt.
 Paul Giamatti as L. Marvin Metz, a writer who also narrates audiobooks; Giamatti appears in an uncredited voice-only role in the first season.
 Cheech Marin as El Confidente, a member of Lodge 55 in Mexico.
 Pollyanna McIntosh as Clara, a member of Lodge 1 in London who befriends Connie. (season 2)
 Mary Elizabeth Ellis as Daphne Larson, Dud's pro bono lawyer. (season 2)
 Bronson Pinchot as Dr. Kimbrough, Liz's new shady boss. (season 2)
 Bertila Damas as Lenore, a friend of Liz and Dud's father with whom she had an affair. (season 2)
 Susy Kane as Genevieve, L. Marvin Metz's pyromaniac French muse. (season 2)

Episodes

Season 1 (2018)

Season 2 (2019)

Production and broadcast
AMC set a straight-to-series order of 10 episodes on October 5, 2016. The first season premiered on August 6, 2018. AMC released the entire first season on its AMC Premiere service on August 6, 2018, in the United States.

On October 4, 2018, the series was renewed for a second season, which premiered on August 12, 2019. The season concluded on October 14, 2019, and the series was canceled two weeks later. The producers tried to shop the series to other outlets, but were unsuccessful, as announced by series creator Jim Gavin in December.

Reception

Critical response
On the review aggregation website Rotten Tomatoes, the first season holds an 86% approval rating with an average rating of 7.12 out of 10, based on 35 reviews. The website's critical consensus reads, "Lodge 49 takes a surreal journey into the television dreamscape that can prove quite rewarding for viewers who stick with it." Metacritic, which uses a weighted average, assigned a score of 70 out of 100 based on 19 critics, indicating "generally favorable reviews".

On Rotten Tomatoes, the second season holds a 100% approval rating with an average rating of 8.69 out of 10, based on 15 reviews. The website's critical consensus reads, "Lodge 49 continues its strange journey with a superb second season that leans further into the show's idiosyncrasies." On Metacritic, the season has a score of 80 out of 100 based on 5 critics, indicating "generally favorable reviews".

The second season received critical acclaim, especially the season finale. Darren Franich of Entertainment Weekly gave it an "A" grade, calling it "perfect". Franich praised Brent Jennings' performance, referring to a moment in "Conjunctio" as his favorite moment on television in 2019. Danette Chavez of The A.V. Club also graded the finale an "A" as well as the season as a whole. Chavez wrote that the finale is "such an incredibly beautiful and uplifting hour of television" and praised Wyatt Russell's performance as "one of the best, most under-the-radar performances of the year." Concluding, she wrote, "'The Door' is a great bridge to a season three, and also an immensely respectful and generous ending to the stories of these Long Beach residents."

In 2021, Jannelle Okwodu of Vogue gave the series a glowing review after discovering episodes on the streaming platform Hulu and described it as "a fantastic puzzle of a series".

Ratings

Season 1

Season 2

Accolades

References

External links
 

2010s American comedy-drama television series
2018 American television series debuts
2019 American television series endings
AMC (TV channel) original programming
English-language television shows
Television shows filmed in Atlanta
Television shows set in Los Angeles County, California